State Road 36 (NM 36) is a state highway in the US state of New Mexico. NM 36's southern terminus in Quemado at U.S. 60 (US 60), and the  northern terminus is at NM 53.

Major intersections

See also

References

036
Transportation in Catron County, New Mexico
Transportation in Cibola County, New Mexico
Transportation in McKinley County, New Mexico